The men's doubles tennis event at the 2019 Summer Universiade was held from 6 to 12 July at the Circolo Tennis and Lungomare in Naples, Italy.

Uzbekistan's Sanjar Fayziev and Khumoyun Sultanov won the gold medals, defeating South Korea's Hong Seong-chan and Shin San-hui in the final, 7–5, 4–6, [10–5].

Japan's Yuya Ito and Sho Shimabukuro, and China's Wu Hao and Xu Shuai won the bronze medals.

Seeds
The top seed received a bye into the second round.

Draw

Finals

Top half

Bottom half

References
Main Draw

Men's doubles